Pushkinsky District is an administrative and municipal district (raion), one of the thirty-six in Moscow Oblast, Russia. It is located in the northern central part of the oblast. Its administrative center is the city of Pushkino. Population: 177,510 (2010 Census);  The population of Pushkino accounts for 58.0% of the district's total population.

Notable residents 

Konstantin Kosachev (born 1962), politician and former diplomat
Ivan Skvortsov-Stepanov (1870–1928), Bolshevik revolutionary and Soviet politician

References

Notes

Sources

Districts of Moscow Oblast